Bryan Thomas (born June 7, 1979) is a former American football linebacker He was drafted by the New York Jets 22nd overall in the 2002 NFL Draft and spent his entire 11-year career with the team. He played college football at the University of Alabama at Birmingham.

Early life
Thomas was born in Birmingham, Alabama. He attended the University of Alabama at Birmingham, where he played college football for the UAB Blazers.

Professional career
The 6'4" Thomas had an impressive combine performance that elevated him from a mid-second round pick to the first round.

Thomas played 15 games in his rookie year of 2002 collecting a half-sack and 5 total tackles.

Thomas played all 16 games (10 started) in 2003 with a sack, 3 passes defended, one fumble recovery, and 26 total tackles.

Thomas played in 14 games (6 started) of the 2004 season with 1.5 sacks, a pass defended, and 28 total tackles.

Playing 16 games (4 starts) of the 2005 season, Thomas has 3.5 sacks, 2 passes defended, and 25 total tackles

Thomas played his entire career as a defensive end until being converted to a linebacker in the 3-4 defense for the Jets during the 2006 NFL season. Thomas became a defensive end when Mangini used a 4-3 defense. Thomas led the New York Jets in sacks with 8.5 sacks. This was his breakout season playing as an outside linebacker with new head coach Eric Mangini. At the end of the 2006 season, Thomas was awarded a new contract.

In 2007, Thomas reverted to the disappointing play that had previously been the hallmark of his career. This raised concerns that Thomas was a "one year wonder" or a "contract year" player.  In particular, comments made by Thomas during the 2007 season where he said he had not thought it necessary to "continue to work to improve" left many Jets fans extremely concerned. Overall, Thomas finished the 2007 season with 2.5 sacks, one pass defended, a forced fumble, and 39 total tackles.

Thomas had a mediocre 2008 season as he collected 5.5 sacks, one pass defended, 2 forced fumbles (1 recovery), and 38 total tackles.

Thomas collected 2 sacks, one pass defended, 2 fumble recoveries, and 41 total tackles. He led the Jets into the playoffs until the team lost in the AFC Championship to the Indianapolis Colts.

In 2010, Thomas changed his jersey number to 58. He collected 6 sacks, one pass defended, a fumble recovery, and 31 total tackles. He led the Jets to the playoffs for the second season in a row but lost the AFC Championship to the Pittsburgh Steelers.

Thomas did not play long during the 2011 season as he suffered a torn Achilles tendon on October 2, 2011, which knocked him out for the rest of the season. Overall, he recorded 10 total tackles and one pass defended in 4 games played.

Thomas was released by the Jets on September 22, 2012 after suffering a hamstring injury. Two days later, the Jets re-signed him. Thomas finished the 2012 season with 2.5 sacks, one pass defended, and 18 total tackles. Thomas was released after the season was over.

NFL statistics

Personal
His son, Bryan Thomas Jr, plays college football for South Carolina. Also, he was an assistant coach on his son’s high school football team.

References

External links
New York Jets bio

1979 births
Living people
African-American players of American football
American football defensive ends
American football outside linebackers
UAB Blazers football players
New York Jets players
People from Adamsville, Alabama
Players of American football from Birmingham, Alabama
21st-century African-American sportspeople
20th-century African-American sportspeople